George Terence Leonard Matthews, known as Terry Matthews (born 25 February 1936), is an English former footballer who played as an inside-forward in the Football League for West Ham United, Aldershot and Gillingham. He later managed non-league clubs Aveley, Tilbury and Walthamstow Avenue.

Matthews played for Hackney and Middlesex Schools and joined West Ham United as a youth. He signed professional forms with the east London club in August 1952. He made his senior debut on 22 October 1953, a 5–1 defeat against Colchester United in the Essex Professional Cup, alongside fellow debutants Andy Malcolm and Fred Cooper.

Matthews would have to wait two-and-a-half years for his league debut, a Second Division encounter against Blackburn Rovers on 17 March 1956. He scored the only West Ham goal of a 4–1 defeat.

After nine league appearances for West Ham, his final game for the club came in the Essex Professional Cup, in a 3–1 win over Chelmsford City on 26 November 1956.

He joined Aldershot in July 1957 and scored 20 goals in 62 appearances, before moving to Gillingham in August 1962. He scored one goal in 12 appearances for the Gills during the 1962–63 season.

Matthews then moved to non-league Ashford Town where he was captain before injury curtailed his playing career. He went on to manage Aveley, and in 1974 moved to Tilbury, with Larry Hutson making a move in the opposite direction. At the end of the 1976–77 season, Matthews left for Walthamstow Avenue.

Matthews, or Mr Matthews as he was known by us, was a PE Teacher at Clissold Park secondary school, N16. I attended that school in 1970 and he was in role then, but it's not known how long he remained. Weekly we would attend Snaresbrook sports fields where Matthews took football training, and was accompanied by another West Ham legend John Dick.

He later managed Sunday league team Ockendon Motor Spares.

References

1936 births
Living people
Footballers from Leyton
English footballers
English football managers
Association football inside forwards
Tufnell Park F.C. players
West Ham United F.C. players
Aldershot F.C. players
Gillingham F.C. players
Ashford United F.C. players
English Football League players
Aveley F.C. managers
Tilbury F.C. managers
Walthamstow Avenue F.C. managers